"Shine On" is a song by Australian rock band The Screaming Jets. The song was released in August 1991 as the third single from their debut studio album All for One (1991). The song peaked at number 36 on the ARIA Charts.

Track listings
 CD Single
 "Shine On" - 4:54
 "Needle"  (live)  - 4:33
 "Got It"  (live)  - 3:33
 "Starting Out"  (live)  - 3:57
 Live tracks recorded at The Palais, Newcastle, in May 1991.

Charts

Release history

References

1990 songs
1991 singles
The Screaming Jets songs